Barbara Lee Smith (born 1 April 1938) is a mixed media artist, writer, educator, and curator.  She creates large scale landscapes and abstract works using a three step process of painting, collage, and machine stitching.

Early life

Barbara Lee Smith was born in Camden, New Jersey and grew up in nearby Cape May.  Her early interests included music, embroidery and the work of Jackson Pollock who she was first exposed to in a 1949 Life magazine article. Smith majored in home economics at Douglass College (then the women's college of Rutgers University).

She married soon after graduating in 1959 and, as a young wife and mother, lived on Long Island, New York and then in Levittown, New York. In Levittown she had easy access to New York City where art exhibitions, most notably a Kandinsky show at the Guggenheim Museum, made an impact.  During this period she taught herself machine embroidery.

In the late 1960s, Smith moved to Chicago where she resided for three decades near the shore of Lake Michigan. She started teaching contemporary embroidery and design and returned to college in 1970, attending graduate school at Northern Illinois University where she received a MFA degree in mixed media in 1978.

In 2000, Smith and her second husband, Mel, relocated to the Pacific Northwest, where they live and work on Raft Island, west of Tacoma, Washington.

Career
Smith has worked as a self-employed studio artist since 1979.  From her work in Chicago, which featured architectural elements, to her work in the Pacific Northwest, with its imagery of land, sea and sky, her work is ethereal and technically adept. In reviewing a 2009 exhibition of Smith's work, Carla Seaquist wrote:  

In essence a seeker, Barbara's artistic purpose is to retrieve those lost things - meaning, mattering, beauty, wit, a sense of the sacred ... Barbara has been faithful to her inner landscapes. It's why her work resonates so deeply: she shows us profound things the modern world has forgotten but desperately needs.

Since 1975, her work has been featured in over 25 solo exhibitions in the US, UK, New Zealand and Japan.  She's participated in dozens of invitational group exhibitions including the Bellevue Art Museum Fiber Biennial, Korea Quilt Festival and the Beijing Art Salon. In a review of a 1989 group exhibition on Long Island, The New York Times called Smith's work "off beat and personal."

... her work cannot be pigeonholed into any category. The artist sprays uncolored dyes on cotton or silk fabrics. The dyes stain, flow together and mix, but the hues do not become visible until the fabric has been exposed to light. Off Beat and Personal. To add texture, Ms. Smith machine-stitches large areas. Again her approach is off beat and personal. By loosening the bobbin tension and tightening the needle tension the stitching results in a series of loops. Most seamstresses would moan and rip out the threads if this were to happen to their seams, but here the looped stitching is repeated back and forth across an area, until it resembles the glistening pile of a nylon rug. Occasional gold threads, flecked with metallic red and green, scintillate like sparklers. Framed and hung together as a unit of six rectangular modules, the flowing shapes take on an organized interrelationship.

Smith also contributes to her field through teaching and curatorial work.  From 2000-2005, she served as a visiting professor in the Department of Design and Embroidery at Joshibi College of Art and Design in Tokyo; conducted workshops and lectures at Stik Plus in the Netherlands between 1999 and 2014; and served as a visiting lecturer at Windsor College, England between 1991 and 2004.  She has curated textile exhibitions in Massachusetts, Chicago, New Zealand, and North Carolina.

Smith authored the book Celebrating the Stitch: Contemporary Embroidery of North America, published by Taunton Press in 1991.  It outlines the movement of embroidery from the home into the artist's studio through a series of interviews with textile artists.  The book includes a range of textile mixed media examples; it also explores creative issues and how to address them.   

Smith has been honored for her work by the Pierce County (Washington) Art Commission's Career Award, named an honorary member of the Embroiderers' Guild of England, as well as Distinguished Resident by the Ragdale Foundation. A lengthy 2009 interview with Smith, part of the Archives of American Art Oral History Program, is available from the Smithsonian's Archives of American Art.

Smith writes: "a personal goal has been to help the field of textiles be recognized as a major art form and to see that those who use fiber as their primary medium are recognized within the larger world of art."

In 2015, Smith wrote about the evolution of her work: 

Growing up in Cape May, New Jersey brought me into everyday contact with the Atlantic Ocean, and much of my life has been spent finding my way from one coast to the other. The urge to be near salt water infused my work while living in Chicago for many years, and as I finally landed more than fifteen years ago in the Pacific Northwest on a small island in Puget Sound, my work evolved from non-representation images to evocations of the land, sea and sky.

Technique

Smith uses a single material: an industrial grade polyester non woven fabric, Lutradur.  She uses it as a canvas for acrylics and silk-paint pigments chosen for light fastness. She creates a painting on the tough fabric, then bonds several layers together to form a base on which she collages small pieces of the painted material, heat setting them in place.

To bind the work together, Smith then "draws with the sewing machine" in lines which resemble a topographical map.  Smith describes her technique as "a three-stage process of painting, collage and drawing."

Smith works on a large scale.  In a 2000 review of a Philadelphia exhibition, the James Renwick Alliance Quarterly noted that the works were "breathtaking in scale, particularly Barbara Lee Smith's fused synthetic fabric pilings, the smallest being a mere 7 1/2 feet while the largest was a towering 9 feet."  More recent works, pictured in this article, are also large scale.

Selected institutional collections 
Source: 
American Embassies in Peru and Sri Lanka
American Medical Association, Chicago
Arrowmont School of Crafts, Gatlinburg, Tennessee
Embroiderers' Guild Museum, UK
Indianapolis Museum of Art
Racine Art Museum
Renwick Gallery, Smithsonian Institution, Washington DC
Swiss-Bernina International, Steckborn, Switzerland
Tacoma Community College, Tacoma, Washington
University of North Carolina at Chapel Hill

References

External links 
 Barbara Lee Smith [artist's website]
 Barbara Lee Smith: The Rhythms of Nature [2014 two-part interview by TextileArtist.org] 
 Barbara Lee Smith: Transitions and Reflections [video produced in 2016 by Barbara Lee Smith, Jennifer Olson-Rudenko and Igor Beschieru for Tacoma Community College]
 Oral history interview with Barbara Lee Smith 2009, 16–17 March, Archives of American Art, Smithsonian Institution.
 Pull of the Moon: Recent Works of Barbara Lee Smith Gregg Museum of Art & Design, North Carolina State University, 2011.
 Transitions & Reflections: Barbara Lee Smith. Tacoma WA: The Gallery at Tacoma Community College, 2016.  Exhibition essay by Dr. Pamela Transue.

1938 births
Living people
Writers from Camden, New Jersey
People from Cape May, New Jersey
People from Long Island
People from Levittown, New York
Writers from Chicago
People from Pierce County, Washington
Mixed-media artists
American embroiderers